Torch Song (also known as Judith Krantz's Torch Song) is a 1993 made-for-TV movie directed by Michael Miller and starring Raquel Welch, Jack Scalia, and Alicia Silverstone. The film originally premiered on ABC on 23 May 1993.

Plot
Paula Eastman (Raquel Welch) is a Hollywood actress with an alcohol problem. Her career is doing poorly, and she sometimes sleeps with actors and producers to get roles; often, she comes home drunk. Paula changes her manager, and her career improves, but her personal life isn't improving along with it. Because of her alcoholism, her relationship with her daughter Delphine (Alicia Silverstone) is strained.

One night, Delphine photographs her mother while she is drunk. After Paula sees the photos, she enters rehabilitation because she doesn't want to see her daughter unhappy. In rehab, she meets a firefighter named Mike (Jack Scalia) who has similar problems. After she returns home, she wants to forge a relationship with Mike and spend time with her daughter, but Delphine is suspicious of Mike, believing him to be much like the other men in her mother's life.

Cast
Raquel Welch as Paula Eastman
Jack Scalia as Mike Lanahan
Alicia Silverstone as Delphine
George Newbern as Wedge
Laura Innes as Ronnie
Stan Ivar as Ken
Lee Garlington as Phyllis

External links

1993 television films
1993 drama films
1993 films
Films about actors
Films about alcoholism
Films scored by Lee Holdridge
Films produced by Steve Krantz
American drama television films
Films directed by Michael Miller (director)
1990s English-language films
1990s American films